Creedence Clearwater Revival is the debut studio album by American rock band Creedence Clearwater Revival, released on July 15, 1968, by Fantasy in the US. Featuring the band's first hit single, "Susie Q", which reached number 11 in the US charts, it was recorded shortly after the band changed its name from the Golliwogs and began developing a signature swamp rock sound.

Background
While "Suzie Q" proved to be a hit, the band had played for years as the Golliwogs in the early 1960s, releasing numerous singles before achieving success in the pop world.  In 1967, Saul Zaentz bought Fantasy Records and offered the band a chance to record a full-length album on the condition that they change their name. Having never liked 'the Golliwogs', in part because of the racial charge of the name, the four readily agreed, coming up with Creedence Clearwater Revival.  In Hank Bordowitz's book Bad Moon Rising: The Unauthorized History of Creedence Clearwater Revival, bassist Stu Cook is quoted, "Fogerty, Cook, Clifford and Fogerty signed a publishing agreement with one of Fantasy's companies that gave up rights to copyright ownership...Lennon and McCartney never owned the copyrights to their compositions, either.  When you're on the bottom, you make the best deal you can." John Fogerty took charge of the group artistically, writing all of the band's fourteen hit records and assuming the roles of singer, guitarist, producer and arranger of nearly everything that appeared on Creedence's seven studio albums.

Composition
"Porterville", which was the last single released by the band under the name the Golliwogs in November 1967, was included on the band's debut album and revealed singer/guitarist John Fogerty's nascent songwriting talents.  The song was a breakthrough of sorts for Fogerty, who stated to Tom Pinnock of Uncut in 2012, "It's semi-autobiographical; I touch on my father, but it's a flight of fantasy, too. And I knew when I was doing it, 'Man, I'm on to something here.' Everything changed after that. I gave up trying to write sappy love songs about stuff I didn't know anything about, and I started inventing stories."  The album also includes the only co-write between John and his brother Tom Fogerty (who had been the original lead singer in the group) to appear on a Creedence album: the foreboding "Walk on the Water".  The song had already been released in 1966 under the Golliwogs name.  The album features three other Fogerty originals: "The Working Man", "Get Down Woman", and "Gloomy".

Creedence Clearwater Revival is best remembered for the band's first hit single "Susie Q", which had been a hit for Dale Hawkins in 1957.  It was released as a single version split into two parts, with the jam session during the coda on the A-side fading out with the guitar solo right before the coda which fades in part two on the B-side.  Fogerty stated in a 1993 interview with Rolling Stone magazine that his purpose in recording  "Susie Q" was to get the song played on KMPX, a funky progressive-rock radio station in San Francisco, which is why the song was extended to eight minutes in length.  Susie Q' was designed to fit right in," he explained. "The eight-minute opus. Feedback. Like [the Paul Butterfield Blues Band's] 'East-West'. And especially the little effect, the little telephone-box [vocal] in the middle, which is the only part I regret now. It's just funny sounding. But, lo and behold, it worked!"  Fogerty elaborated to Larry King in 1999, "We recorded an old Dale Hawkins song but I psychedelicized it to get it played on the local San Francisco underground radio station."  The guitarist on the original Hawkins version, James Burton, would also exert a major influence on Fogerty, with the singer telling Lynne Margolis of American Songwriter, "James Burton was a huge influence on me going back to when I was a child, when I bought that record, 'Susie Q,' and that was James Burton playing that guitar—which I didn't know at the time, of course."  Drummer Doug Clifford concurs to Jeb Wright on the Classic Rock Revisited website that he too tried to experiment with the tune, recalling Susie Q' was a rockabilly song that sounded like all of the other rockabilly songs.  I came up with a quarter note idea and it made it harder edged and it gave it space and a totally different feel..."  The Creedence version would reach #11 in the charts.  In 2012 David Cavanagh of Uncut wrote, "For all his skepticism about long solos, Fogerty stretched out penetratingly on guitar while Creedence's rhythm trio laid down a sublime slow boogie."  In 1998, Fogerty stated to Harold Steinblatt of Guitar World that the recording of "Susie Q" was "very pivotal" in another respect:

it established how we would work for the next few years.  After we finished recording our parts, the other guys hung around while I mixed.  The problem was they were making all these comments like, "Well, that won't work.  This won't work."  You know, they were having a great time laughing...And that was the very last time I ever allowed them to be around when I mixed a record...Basically, we'd go in, we'd record the band, and then I'd throw them out of the studio.  I just couldn't have them around while I was doing overdubs or when I was mixing, because they weren't very constructive.

The album's other notable cover, the Screamin' Jay Hawkins classic "I Put a Spell on You", was a natural for Fogerty, whose own manic vocal delivery had much in common with Hawkins' powerful singing style.  Released as a follow up to "Susie Q" in October 1968 with "Walk on the Water" as the B-side, it peaked on the U.S. charts at #58.

The album was remastered and reissued on 180 Gram vinyl by Analogue Productions in 2006.

Reception

While the band did gain success with their chart debut, critics initially denied the band respect.  Barry Gifford writing in Rolling Stone at the time stated, "The only bright spot in the group is John Fogerty, who plays lead guitar and does the vocals. He's a better-than-average singer (really believable in Wilson Pickett's "Ninety-Nine and a Half"), and an interesting guitarist. But there's nothing else here. The drummer is monotonous, the bass lines are all repetitious and the rhythm guitar is barely audible."  Time has been far kinder to the album, although critics note that Fogerty's songwriting talent had yet to truly blossom as it would on the band's future albums and singles.

On AllMusic the album received 4 stars (out of 5), with Stephen Thomas Erlewine stating: "Released in the summer of 1968 - a year after the Summer of Love, but still in the thick of the Age of Aquarius - Creedence Clearwater Revival's self-titled debut album was gloriously out-of-step with the times, teeming with John Fogerty's Americana fascinations." He also noted that the album "points the way to the breakthrough of Bayou Country, with "Porterville" being "an exceptional song with great hooks, an underlying sense of menace, and the first inkling of the working-class rage that fueled such landmarks as 'Fortunate Son.'"

The album was first certified Gold by the RIAA on December 16, 1970, then Platinum twenty years later on December 13, 1990.

Track listing
All songs except bonus tracks written by John Fogerty, except where noted. All tracks recorded February 1968, except where indicated.

 Sides one and two were combined as tracks 1–8 on CD reissues.

Personnel
Performers
 John Fogerty – lead guitar, lead vocals, tambourine, maracas, wind-up toys
 Tom Fogerty – rhythm guitar, backing vocals; co-lead vocals on "Suzie Q"
 Stu Cook – bass guitar, backing vocals
 Doug Clifford – drums, backing vocals

Charts

Certifications

References

External links

 Infosite

1968 debut albums
Albums produced by Saul Zaentz
Swamp rock albums
Creedence Clearwater Revival albums
Fantasy Records albums